Why the Sheriff Is a Bachelor (sub-titled The Fragile Reward of Duty) is a 1914 American short silent Western film produced by Selig Polyscope Company and written by Joseph A. Golden who co-directed with the star Tom Mix. It is a remake of the 1911 film of the same title in which Mix also starred. The 1914 version is held at the Library of Congress.

Cast
 Tom Mix – The Sheriff
 Goldie Colwell – Alice
 Leo D. Maloney – Alice's Brother
 Roy Watson – Roy Watson

See also
 Tom Mix filmography

References

External links
 

1914 films
1914 Western (genre) films
1914 short films
American silent short films
American black-and-white films
Films directed by Joseph A. Golden
Selig Polyscope Company films
Silent American Western (genre) films
1910s American films